State Highway 15 (Tamil Nadu) (SH-15) is a State Highway maintained by the Highways Department of Government of Tamil Nadu. It connects Erode with Udagamandalam (Ooty) in the western part of Tamil Nadu.

Route
The total length of the SH-15 is 161.6 km.

Route: Erode- Gobichettipalayam - Sathyamangalam - Mettupalayam - Kotagiri - Udagamandalam

The Mettupalayam-Kotagiri section is also known as Kotagiri Ghat Road. It is one of the five Nilgiri Ghat Roads.

Destinations
The highway passes through the following places:
 Erode District - Erode, Gobichettipalayam, Sathyamangalam
 Coimbatore District - Mettupalayam
 Nilgiris District - Kotagiri, Udagamandalam

Junctions  

The highway meets the following arterial roads along the way:
 State Highway 20 at Erode
 National Highway 544 at Chittode
 State Highway 81 at Gobichettipalayam
 State Highway 15A at Gobichettipalayam
 National Highway 948 at Sathyamangalam
 National Highway 181 at Mettupalayam

References

State highways in Tamil Nadu
Transport in Erode
Transport in Ooty